The 1993 Michigan Wolverines football team represented the University of Michigan in the 1993 NCAA Division I-A football season. The team's head coach was Gary Moeller. The Wolverines played their home games at Michigan Stadium. That year Michigan Wolverines football competed in the Big Ten Conference in almost all intercollegiate sports including men's college football. The team featured three All-Americans: Tyrone Wheatley, Buster Stanley, and Ty Law. Stanley, who was the team MVP, served as co-captain with Ricky Powers. The team posted an 8–4 overall record (5–3 Big Ten) and won the 1994 Hall of Fame Bowl.

Schedule

Statistical achievements
Wheatley was the repeat Big Ten scoring champion with an 8.4 points per game average in all games, although he lost the conference games title to Purdue's Mike Alstott.

The team led the Big Ten in passing efficiency for conference games (155.2), although Wisconsin won the title for all games. The team earned the fourth of four consecutive and six 1990s Big Ten rushing defense statistical championships for all games by holding opponents to 108.0 yards per game. The team also earned the third of five consecutive and six 1990s Big Ten rushing defense statistical championships for conference games by holding opponents to 103.0 yards per game. The team led the Big Ten Conference in scoring defense for conference games (11.4 points per game) and all games (13.3).

Todd Collins established the school record for single-season pass attempts (296), eclipsing Jim Harbaugh's 1986 total of 277 and broken by Brian Griese in 1997.

Roster

Season summary

Washington State

Michigan, ranked #3 to open the season, jumped to a 31-0 lead before the Cougars got on the scoreboard. Touchdown runs by Ricky Powers (1 yard) and Tyrone Wheatley (59 yards) along with two Todd Collins TD passes to Mercury Hayes, staked the Wolverines to a 31-7 halftime lead. Michigan added a Collins to Amani Toomer 24 yard TD pass and a Pete Elizovic field goal in the 2nd half. Wheatley finished with 118 yards rushing and Collins completed 19 of 29 passes for 265 yards. Shonte Peoples had an interception for the Wolverine defense.

Notre Dame

No. 11 Notre Dame traveled to Ann Arbor to face the No. 3 Wolverines in an era where both Michigan and Notre Dame figured into the national title picture every year. The underdog Irish took a 27-10 third quarter lead. Late in the fourth, the Irish still led 27-16 and were poised to put the game out of reach before a goal line stand ended with fullback Marc Edwards stuffed on a 4th and goal run. Michigan proceeded to drive 99 yards for a touchdown, cutting the Notre Dame advantage to four. Notre Dame recovered the ensuing onside kick attempt and held on to win.

Houston

The #8 ranked Wolverines raced to a 28-0 first half lead before Houston knew what hit them as Michigan rolled to a 42-21 victory over the Cougars. Tyrone Wheatley scored from 25 yards and 5 yards to get the Wolverines going. Todd Collins hit Amani Toomer for a 15 yard TD strike and Ricky Powers scored 3 yards out before the Cougars finally got on the scoreboard. Wheatley added a 9 yard TD run and Tim Biakabutuka scored from 4 yards out for Michigan in the 2nd half. Wheatley finished with 171 yards rushing and Mercury Hayes led the Air Corps with 6 catches for 127 yards. Collins finished the day completing 20 of 34 passes for 267 yards. Ty Law led the Wolverine defense with 6 tackles and an interception.

Iowa
Michigan held the vaunted Hawkeye rushing game to 48 yards and the offense produced enough to beat Iowa, 24-7, in the Big Ten opener at Michigan Stadium in front of 105,000 fans. Tyrone Wheatley once again led the #8 ranked Wolverines with 113 yards rushing and scoring two touchdowns on the ground. Todd Collins was an efficient 13 of 19 for 178 yards and a TD pass to Wheatley. Jarrett Irons led the defense with 14 tackles and Shonte Peoples had an interception.

at Michigan State
The #9 ranked Wolverines traveled to East Lansing to play Michigan State and were dominated on both sides of the line of scrimmage as the Spartans pulled of a 17-7 upset and reclaimed the Paul Bunyan Trophy. The Spartan defense held Michigan to 33 yards rushing while allowing 212 yards passing. MSU had a 17-0 lead in the 3rd quarter before the Wolverines stuck on a Todd Collins 21 yard TD pass to Derrick Alexander. Alexander led the receivers with 7 catches for 99 yards. The Spartans held an almost 9 minute advantage in time-of-possession.

at Penn State
Michigan traveled to College Park to play the #7 ranked Nittany Lions before over 96,000 fans at Beaver Stadium. The Wolverines fell behind 10-0 in the 1st half, but rallied for a 21-13 victory. Derrick Alexander got the Wolverines going with a 48 yard punt return for a touchdown in the 2nd quarter to cut the lead to 10-7. Mercury Hayes caught a 16 yard TD pass from Todd Collins to give Michigan the lead, Penn State was turned away on 4th down on their attempt to retake the lead, and Collins hit Che Foster for a 5 yard TD strike in the 4th quarter to seal the Wolverine victory. Tyrone Wheatley led the way for the Wolverines with 192 yards rushing and Collins was 13 for 16 with 132 yards passing. Shonte Peoples had an interception to lead the defense.

Illinois
Johnny Johnson passed 15 yards to Jim Klein for the winning touchdown with 34 seconds left in the game as the Fighting Illini upset #13 ranked Michigan at the “Big House” in front of over 106,000 fans. Illinois took an early 7-0 lead on Johnson’s 17 yard TD pass to Ken Dilger. Michigan struck back on a Todd Collins 13 yard TD pass to Derrick Alexander and a Collins to Amani Toomer 56 yard strike to give the Wolverines a 14-10 lead. Michigan stretched the lead to 21-10 on a Collins to Alexander 90 yard TD pass in the 3rd quarter, but the Illini rallied with 14 fourth quarter points, starting with a Ty Douthard 1 yard TD run. The Illini defense held Michigan to 76 yards rushing. Collins completed 14 of 23 passes for 286 yards while Alexander had 7 catches for 188 yards.

at Wisconsin
The #21 ranked Badgers shut down #24 Michigan’s running game, holding them to 111 yards, while producing enough offense for a 13-10 victory at Camp Randall Stadium. Rick Schnetzky kicked two field goals and Terrell Fletcher ran for a 12 yard touchdown to provide the Badger points. Todd Collins threw a 7 yard TD pass to Derrick Alexander in the 3rd quarter to close within 13-10, but the Wolverines would get no closer. Collins was 21 for 31 and 248 yards passing, but threw two interceptions. Jarrett Irons and Shonte Peoples led the Michigan defense with 16 and 15 tackles each.

Purdue
Tim Biakabutuka ran for 140 yards and two touchdowns as Michigan managed to finally put away the Boilermakers, 25-10. The Wolverines held a tenuous 3-0 halftime lead, then put up 22 second half points to come away with the victory. Pete Elezovic kicked two field goals and Biakabutuka’s 3 yard run with 23 seconds left sealed the win. Todd Collins completed 18 of 21 passes for 177 yards. The Wolverine defense held Purdue to 8 yards rushing. Jarrett Irons led the defense with 12 tackles and an interception.

at Minnesota
Michigan stormed to a 41-0 halftime lead and breezed to a 58-7 victory over the Golden Gophers at the HHH Metrodome. Tyrone Wheatley ran for 82 yards and scored 3 touchdowns while Tim Biakabutuka ran for two touchdowns to lead the Wolverine offense. Todd Collins completed 7 of 11 passes for 164 yards and a 22 yard TD pass to Walter Smith. Amani Toomer had 3 catches for 88 yards. The Wolverine defense held Minnesota to 15 yards rushing along with Ty Law having 2 interceptions and Deollo Anderson and Clarence Thompson each had 1 interception.

Ohio State

Michigan hosted #5 Ohio State at Michigan Stadium before over 106,000 fans. The Wolverines dominated and handed the Buckeyes their first loss of the season, shutting them out, 28-0. Michigan took a 21-0 halftime lead on two Todd Collins touchdown passes, one to Mercury Hayes (25 yards) and one to Che Foster (3 yards), and Jon Ritchie’s 1 yard run. Michigan closed out the scoring on an Ed Davis 5 yard run. Tyrone Wheatley ran for 108 yards and Davis added 102 yards, while Collins was 14 of 20 for 140 yards. The Wolverine defense held Ohio State to 212 total yards and Ty Law had 2 interceptions, while Chuck Winters and Alfie Burch each had one interception.

1994 Hall of Fame Bowl

The 1994 Hall of Fame Bowl opened the New Year's Day bowl festivities with an 11 a.m. kickoff in unusually wet conditions for the Tampa, Fla., site. By the time the rain subsided and the other New Year's Day bowl games were set to begin, Michigan was well on its way to a 42-7 trouncing of North Carolina State. Tyrone Wheatley, in his third consecutive tremendous bowl outing, was named the game's MVP after compiling 124 rushing yards on 19 carries, including touchdown runs of 26 and 18 yards. 
Michigan opened the scoring early in the second quarter—the first points in what would become consecutive 21 point quarters. Wheatley took a pitch from Todd Collins on a sweep to the right and blazed down the sidelines for a 21 yard score. On their subsequent possession, the Wolfpack were forced to punt, and Derrick Alexander made N.C. State pay. He fielded the punt at Michigan's 21 yard line and burst up the middle of the field unchallenged for a 79 yard touchdown—the longest punt return in Hall of Fame Bowl history. The Wolverines put away the game late in the half. Closing a 13 play, 85 yard drive, Collins, on fourth and 10 from the Wolfpack 31, found Amani Toomer in the right comer of the endzone for a score. The conversion gave the Wolverines a 21-0 lead. The scoring continued for Michigan in the third quarter, as it strung together two more touchdowns---on Clarence Thompson's 43 yard interception return and Wheatley's 18 yard scoring run-before N.C. State finally broke the shutout with a touchdown of its own, Wheatley's score-his sixth bowl touchdown over the past three seasons-was the 35th rushing TD of his career, breaking Rick Leach's school record for career rushing TDs. It was also Wheatley's 40th career touchdown, tying him with Anthony Carter for the most career TDs by a Wolverine. Ricky Powers closed the game's scoring with a 16 yard TD run with 3:13 left in the third.

Awards and honors
Captain: Buster Stanley, Ricky Powers
Academic All-American: Marc Milia (second team)
All-Conference: Tyrone Wheatley, Buster Stanley, Ty Law
Most Valuable Player: Buster Stanley
Meyer Morton Award: Todd Collins
John Maulbetsch Award: Chuck Winters
Frederick Matthei Award: Tyrone Wheatley
Arthur Robinson Scholarship Award: Marc Milia
Dick Katcher Award: Buster Stanley
Hugh Rader Jr. Award: Joe Marinaro
Robert P. Ufer Award: Walter Smith
Roger Zatkoff Award: Gannon Dudlar

Coaching staff
Head coach: Gary Moeller
Assistant coaches: Cam Cameron, Lloyd Carr, Mike DeBord, Bill Harris, Jim Herrmann, Fred Jackson, Greg Mattison, Les Miles, Bobby Morrison
Trainer: Paul Schmidt
Manager: Joe Allore, Kevin Brickner, Steve Connelly, Joel Gerring, Andy Riegler, Mark Mattesi, Marty Rice, Lance Satterthwaite, Michael Weiskopf

References

External links
 1993 Football Team -- Bentley Historical Library, University of Michigan Athletics History

Michigan
Michigan Wolverines football seasons
ReliaQuest Bowl champion seasons
Michigan Wolverines football